Johnny Dawes (born 9 May 1964) is a British rock climber and author, known for his dynamic climbing style and bold traditional climbing routes. This included the first ascent of Indian Face, the first-ever route at the E9-grade. His influence on British climbing was at its peak in the mid to late-1980s.

Climbing career

Dawes' climbing career splits into an initial period pre-1986 where he focused on gritstone in the Peak District, which was suited to his unique climbing style (e.g. Gaia, and End of the Affair).  From 1986, Dawes focused on Wales and on a diverse range of rock, from the slate quarries of Llanberis (e.g. The Quarryman, The Very Big and the Very Small, and Dawes of Perception), to the quartzite cliffs of Gogarth North Stack (e.g. Conan the Librarian, and Hardback Thesaurus), and the rhyolite mountain crags of Clogwyn Du'r Arddu (e.g. Indian Face).  Dawes is remembered for intimidating traditional climbing routes, in the legacy of Pete Livesey, Ron Fawcett and John Redhead, and less for sport climbing routes, unlike his contemporaries Jerry Moffatt and Ben Moon.

Dawes came to prominence outside of the rock climbing world with his 4 October 1986 ascent of Indian Face, the first E9-graded traditional rock route in Britain, and at the time, considered to be the hardest and most dangerous traditional route in the world. The guidebook described it as "A pitch of such appalling difficulty as to be almost beyond the realms of human comprehension".  In a 2011 interview, Dawes said: "As you set off it's best to consider yourself already dead. You just do it". The climb, and rare repeats, are the subject of a 2006 documentary, Johnny Dawes and the Story of Indian Face. 

In 1993, Dawes was a member of an expedition funded by the Mount Everest Foundation to attempt the first ascent of The Shark's Fin on Meru Peak in Gangotri Himalaya, India; a dropped boot led to a forced descent from 6,000 meters to avoid frostbite.

Style

Dawes had a uniquely dynamic technique, leaping between very small holds, and also for his levels of balance and foot-control that enable him to climb extreme-grade routes without using his hands.  Welsh climber George Smith said: "His climbing seemed choreographed rather than constructed in a gym. If there's perfect pitch for movement, he has it".  Aspects of his unique technique was captured in the 1986 climbing film, Stone Monkey, considered one of the best-ever films in the genre, as well as the 2015 climbing series, No Handed Climbing, and other "no-hands", and "no-feet" videos. 

His unorthodox climbing style, coupled with his reputation for a keen intellect and an artistic or bohemian bent, made Dawes an enigmatic and mercurial character in British climbing. His writing has been called "quirky, convoluted, and often obscure", and a tendency to "speak in riddles" earned him the titles of "nutty professor", and of "mad genius" from some commentators. His approach also made it difficult to secure commercial sponsorship, with Dawes saying in a 2019 interview, "I wasn’t supported by the climbing industry because I didn't fit the commercial template".

Legacy
Dawes is widely considered a legend of British rock climbing, and one of the most influential figures in British rock climbing history.  Over a career spanning the early-1980s to the early-1990s, he pushed the technical level of traditional climbing with routes that were unprecedented both in terms of difficulty, and the style in which they were climbed. In 2012, The Guardian called Dawes a "defining figure" and that: "His climbs were rated among the very hardest in the world, test pieces of both balance and nerve, some with a reputation for terrible danger". Some of his routes are still so intimidating that they are rarely repeated, and several feature in climbing films focused on Dawes (e.g.  80s Birth of Extreme) and his routes (e.g. Hard Grit, Quarrymen).

Personal life
Dawes was born in 1964 in Birmingham, into a wealthy family, whose parents were part of the 1960s British motor racing scene,.  His education at the Uppingham School was a difficult one, with Dawes suffering from periods of depression and bullying.

Dawes rejected the career path of his contemporaries into third-level education and then a likely London-based career, choosing instead to obsess on climbing, telling The Guardian, "I was in a shut-off state, to a certain extent. When I was doing something dangerous it would wake me up".

Notable ascents
 1986: Gaia (E8 6c), Black Rocks, Derbyshire. First ascent. Britain's first grade-E8; featured in the 1998 film, Hard Grit; repeats are coveted.
 1986: End of the Affair (E8 6c), Curbar Edge. First ascent. Dawes' hardest gritstone route, and the end of a period of focus by Dawes on gritstone.
 1986: Indian Face (E9 6c), Clogwyn Du'r Arddu, Snowdonia. First ascent. Britain's first grade-E9, and considered the world's hardest climb at the time; features in the 2006 climbing-film, Johnny Dawes and the Indian Face.
 1986: The Quarryman (E8 7a), Twll Mawr, Dinorwic quarry, Llanberis. First ascent, 4 pitches on Welsh slate, one of the hardest climbing routes at the time, now part of a 2019 climbing film, The Quarrymen, and its notorious Groove pitch features in the 1986 climbing film, Stone Monkey. 
 1987: The Scoop (E7 6b), Strone Ulladale, Harris. First ascent with Paul Pritchard of 8 pitches of Doug Scott's 1969 grade-A5 aid climbing route; considered in 1984 to be one of British climbing's "great challenges"; partly shown in the 1988 film, 80s Birth of Extreme.
 1988: Hardback Thesaurus (E7/8 6c), Gogarth North Stack. First ascent and first onsight of an E7; is shown in the 1988 film, 80s Birth of Extreme.    
 1990: The Very Big & the Very Small , Rainbow Slab Area, Dinorwic quarry, Llanberis. First ascent. Only 3-bolts, hardest slate route at time; rarely repeated; Dawes believes grade is 8c.  
First ascent. Gritstone slab at E8 7a without bouldering pads, or a  boulder with pads.
 1995: Face Mecca (E9 6c), Clogwyn Du'r Arddu, Snowdonia. Second ascent. FFA Nick Dixon in 1989.

Bibliography
Peak Rock – The History, The Routes, The Climbers, (Phil Kelly, Graham Hoey, Giles Barker), 2013. . 
Full of Myself (Johnny Dawes), 2011. .

Filmography
 Documentary on The Quarryman (E8 7a): 
 Documentary on The Indian Face (E9 6c): 
 Documentary on the hardest gritstone routes in Peak District: 
 Documentary on leading UK climbers: 
 Documentary on Dawes, Ben Moon and Jerry Moffatt: 
 Documentary on Dawes' technique:

See also
History of rock climbing
List of first ascents (sport climbing)
Dave MacLeod, Scottish traditional climber
Sonnie Trotter, Canadian traditional climber
Rock climbing in the Peak District

Notes

References

External links
 
 Johnny Dawes, rock climber: 'You've got to mess about', The Guardian (video interview, 2012)
 Johnny Dawes, Old website of Johnny Dawes (archived, 2013)
 Johnny Dawes (1983–2003), ClimbandMore.com (archived, 2019)
 Johnny Dawes Filmography, MNTN Film Database (January 2022)

1964 births
Living people
People educated at Uppingham School
British rock climbers
Free soloists
Sportspeople from Birmingham, West Midlands
English male non-fiction writers
21st-century English male writers
English non-fiction outdoors writers